MS Zeus Palace is an Italian ferry, which is operated by Grimaldi Lines. The ship built in 2001 at Samsung Heavy Industries South Korea for Minoan Lines and her first name was Prometheus. When the ship was operated for Minoan Lines Prometheus with her sisters ship Oceanus and Ariadne Palace did the route Patras, Igoumenitsa, Corfu, Venice route at list 22 hours trip. After the ship in Summer 2002 transferred to Patras, Igoumenitsa, Corfu, Bari route but it was unsuccessful. The ship then chartered for Caronte and Tourist and then sold. Caronte and Tourist after sold the ship to Grimaldi Lines with the name Eurostar Parcelona. The ship made many charteres in her life for Minoan Lines, Grandi Navi Veloci etc. Then the ship named Zeus Palace for Grimaldi Lines and every day does the Livorno, Olbia route.

References

2000 ships